Chama Milind (born 4 September 1994) is an Indian first-class cricketer plays for Hyderabad cricket team. He is a left-handed batsman and left-arm medium bowler. He was also member of India Under-19 cricket team. In February 2022, he was bought by the Royal Challengers Bangalore in the auction for the 2022 Indian Premier League tournament.

References

https://www.assamrifles.org/2022/03/chama-milind-cricketer-biography-wiki.html

1994 births
Living people
Indian cricketers
Hyderabad cricketers
Sunrisers Hyderabad cricketers
Delhi Capitals cricketers
India Red cricketers
Cricketers from Hyderabad, India